Langenselbold station is a station in the town of Langenselbold in the German state of Hesse on the Kinzig Valley Railway. The station is classified by Deutsche Bahn (DB) as a category 4 station.

History
Langenselbold station was opened on 1 May 1867 along with the Hanau–Waechtersbach section of the Frankfurt–Bebra railway.

Entrance building 
The  entrance building is asymmetric and was built in 1868 in the neoclassical style. It is therefore one of the line's "first generation" buildings. However, it has changed in its appearance: both the original two-storey main building and the eastern wing, formerly a single-storey row of restaurants, were later raised by one storey. The original structure is presumably based on a design by Julius Eugen Ruhl. The entrance building is listed as a monument under the Hessian Heritage Act.

Operations
The station has a “home” platform (next to the station building) and an island platform.
The line between Wolfgang and Gelnhausen is cleared for operations at 200 km/h, so that long-distance trains run through the station at high speed. Langenselbold station is now only served by local and regional services and has significance for commuter traffic to and from the Rhine-Main area.

From 1904 to 1963, Langenselbold station was served by the standard gauge Freigericht Light Railway of the Gelnhausen District Railway. The Gelnhausen District Railway had its own entrance building and separate facilities east of the "state” station. The Hanau Light Railway (Hanauer Kleinbahn) also ran between Hanau and Langenselbold, but operated from its own station in Langenselbold, which was significantly closer to central Langenselbold  than the "state” station.

Notes

References
 

Railway stations in Hesse
Neoclassical architecture in Germany
Railway stations in Germany opened in 1867
Buildings and structures in Main-Kinzig-Kreis